This is a list of the first women lawyer(s) and judge(s) in Oregon. It includes the year in which the women were admitted to practice law (in parentheses). Also included are women who achieved other distinctions such becoming the first in their state to graduate from law school or become a political figure.

Firsts in Oregon's history

Lawyers 

 First female: Mary Leonard (1885)  
 First African American female: Mercedes Deiz (1960)

Law Clerk 

 First female to clerk for a federal judge in Oregon: Helen F. Althaus (1945) from 1947-1949

State judges 

 First female (temporary): Ethel Graham in 1914 
 First female: Mary Jane Spurlin (1924) 
 First female (circuit court): Jean Lagerquist Lewis (1938) in 1961 
 First African American female: Mercedes Deiz (1960) in 1969 
 First female (Oregon Court of Appeals): Betty Roberts (1966) in 1977 
 First female (Supreme Court of Oregon): Betty Roberts (1966) in 1982 
 First openly lesbian female: Janice Wilson in 1991 
 First females (tax court): Jill A. Tanner and Coyreen Weidner in 1997 
 First female (Chief Judge; Oregon Court of Appeals): Mary Deits in 1997  
 First Hispanic American female (Oregon Court of Appeals): Darleen Ortega (1989) in 2003 
 First African American (female) (appellate court): Adrienne Nelson (1993) in 2006 
 First Asian American female: Youlee Yim You in 2007  
 First openly lesbian female (Supreme Court of Oregon): Virginia Linder (1980) in 2007  
 First openly lesbian and Asian American (female) (Oregon Court of Appeals): Lynn Nakamoto (1985) in 2011  
 First openly lesbian and Asian American (female) (Supreme Court of Oregon): Lynn Nakamoto (1985) in 2015  
 First African American (female) (Supreme Court of Oregon): Adrienne Nelson (1993) in 2018
 First female (Chief Justice; Supreme Court of Oregon): Martha Lee Walters in 2018

Federal judges 

 First female (U.S. District Court of Oregon): Helen Frye (1966) in 1980  
 First female (U.S. Bankruptcy Court): Polly Higden in 1983  
 First female (magistrate; United States District Court for the District of Oregon): Janice Stewart in 1993  
 First female (U.S. Court of Appeals for the Ninth Circuit): Susan P. Graber (1972) in 1998  
 First female (Chief Judge; United States District Court Judge for the District of Oregon): Ann Aiken (1979) in 2009
 First Asian American (female) (magistrate; United States District Court for the District of Oregon): Youlee Yim You in 2016 
 First Asian American (female) (U.S. Court of Appeals for the Ninth Circuit): Jennifer Sung in 2021

Attorney General 

 First female: Ellen Rosenblum (1975) in 2012

Assistant Attorney General 

 First female (Department of Justice): Armonica Gilford (1981) in 1989

Solicitor General 

 First openly lesbian female: Virginia Linder (1980) from 1986-1997

United States Attorney 

 First female (law clerk): Susan P. Graber (1972)

Political Office 

First openly bisexual female (governor): Kate Brown (1985) in 2015

Oregon State Bar Association 

 First female president: Julie Frantz in 1992 
 First Asian American (female) president: Liani J. Reeves in 2020

Firsts in local history

 Barb Haslinger and Alta Brady: First female judges respectively in Central Oregon (1990 and 1994)
 Paula Bechtold (1975): First female judge in Coos County, Oregon
 Diana Wales (1977): First female lawyer in private practice in Roseburg, Oregon [Douglas County, Oregon]
 Jeannette Thatcher Marshall (1946): First female lawyer in Medford, Oregon [Jackson County, Oregon]
 Beth Heckert: First female District Attorney for Jackson County, Oregon (c. 2013)
 Valerie Love: First Asian American female to become a Judge of the Lane County Superior Court, Oregon (2007)
 Clara Rigmaiden: First Hispanic American female to become a Judge of the Lane County Superior Court, Oregon (2007)
 Patty Perlow: First female District Attorney for Lane County, Oregon (2015)
 Jolie Russo (1988): First female magistrate in Eugene, Oregon (2016) [Lane County, Oregon]
 Sharon Cox Stevens (1978): First female lawyer in Linn County, Oregon
 Hattie Bratzel Kremen: First female District Attorney for Marion County, Oregon (1956-1964)
 Jean Lagerquist Lewis (1938): First female judge in Multnomah County, Oregon (1954)
 Beatrice Morrow Cannady (Law Degree, 1922): First African American female lawyer to appear in Portland, Oregon [Multnomah County, Oregon]
 Youlee You: First Asian American female to become a Judge of the Multnomah County Superior Court, Oregon (2007)
 Nancy W. Campbell: First female judge in Washington County, Oregon
 Carol E. Jones: First female judge appointed to the Yamhill County Circuit Court [Yamhill County, Oregon]

See also  

 List of first women lawyers and judges in the United States
 Timeline of women lawyers in the United States
 Women in law

Other topics of interest 

 List of first minority male lawyers and judges in the United States
 List of first minority male lawyers and judges in Oregon

References 

Lawyers, Oregon, first
Oregon, first
Women
Women, Oregon, first
Women in Oregon
Lists of people from Oregon